Aster Janssens (born 12 March 2001) is a Belgian footballer who plays as a midfielder for Standard Liège and the Belgium national team.

International career
Janssens made her debut for the Belgium national team on 12 June 2021, against Luxembourg.

References

2001 births
Living people
Women's association football midfielders
Belgian women's footballers
Belgium women's international footballers
KRC Genk Ladies players
Standard Liège (women) players
Super League Vrouwenvoetbal players
Belgium women's youth international footballers